Song for Anyone is an album by jazz saxophonist Chris Potter released on the Sunnyside label in 2007. It features Potter leading a ten piece ensemble of woodwinds, reeds & strings in a presentation of ten of his original compositions. It was produced by Potter’s former employer, bassist Dave Holland.

Reception

The AllMusic review by Michael G. Nastos awarded the album 4 stars stating "A departure from Potter's small group efforts, this project is close to perfect, and considering his high-level output, may be the highlight of his discography. Everyone should hear Song for Anyone".

PopMatters correspondent Will Layman observed "The general tone of Music for Anyone is gentle, despite Potter's ability to heat things up on tenor ... Though there are ten musicians woven through these carefully arranged and episodic compositions, there is plenty of room in the middle for rays of light and breathing room".

Track listing
All compositions by Chris Potter
 "The Absence" − 7:36
 "Against the Wind" − 7:58
 "Closer to the Sun" − 8:08
 "Family Tree" − 4:52
 "Chief Seattle" − 9:44
 "Cupid and Psyche" − 9:11
 "Song for Anyone" − 8:57
 "The Arc of a Day" − 4:00
 "Estrellas del Sur" − 8:01
 "All by All" − 4:45

Personnel
Chris Potter - tenor saxophone, soprano saxophone
Erica von Kleist − flute
Greg Tardy − clarinet
Michael Rabinowitz − bassoon
Mark Feldman − violin
Lois Martin − viola
David Eggar − cello
Steve Cardenas − guitar
Scott Colley − acoustic bass
Adam Cruz - drums, percussion

References

Chris Potter (jazz saxophonist) albums
2007 albums
Sunnyside Records albums